Ross Porter "Rosie" Grant (December 28, 1906 – June 15, 1976) was an American professional football player who spent three seasons in the National Football League with the Staten Island Stapletons and the Cincinnati Reds from 1932 to 1934. Grant appeared in 22 games, while making 14 starts.

References

1906 births
1976 deaths
New York University alumni
Players of American football from Massachusetts
Staten Island Stapletons players
Cincinnati Reds (NFL) players